In music, Op. 112 stands for Opus number 112. Compositions that are assigned this number include:

 Beethoven – Meeresstille und glückliche Fahrt
 Dvořák – The Devil and Kate
 Ries – Symphony No. 5
 Schumann – Der Rose Pilgerfahrt
 Shostakovich – Symphony No. 12
 Sibelius – Tapiola
 Weinberg – Lady Magnesia